

Bandy

World Championship
 January 18 – 25: 2009 Bandy World Championship in  Västerås
 Division A:  defeated , 6–1, to win the Bandy World Championship title.  took the bronze medal.
 Division B:  won the preliminary round and played a qualifying match against  for Division A, but lost 1–3, thus not replacing Belarus in Division A next year.

Curling

World Championship
 April 4–12, 2009, 2009 World Men's Curling Championship
  (Murdoch) defeated  (Martin), 7–6, to win Scotland's fifth World Championship title.  (Stöckli) won the bronze medal.

Figure skating

During the season, the following skaters won ISU Championships.

Ice hockey
 January 1 – 2009 NHL Winter Classic between Chicago Blackhawks and Detroit Red Wings played at Wrigley Field.
 April 18 – Bentley Generals win 2009 Allan Cup Canadian senior championship.
 April 19 – Ak Bars Kazan win 2009 Gagarin Cup.
 May 9 – Phoenix Coyotes file for bankruptcy.
 May 10 –  defeats  2–1 to win the 2009 IIHF World Championship.
 May 24 – Windsor Spitfires win 2009 Memorial Cup Canadian junior championship.
 June 12 – Pittsburgh Penguins defeat the Detroit Red Wings to win the 2009 Stanley Cup. Evgeni Malkin is awarded the Conn Smythe Trophy.
 June 26–27 – 2009 NHL Entry Draft held in Montreal.
 September 29 – ZSC Lions defeat the Chicago Blackhawks to win the 2009 Victoria Cup.
 December 4 – 100th anniversary of the Montreal Canadiens hockey club.
 Martin Brodeur breaks all records and passes Patrick Roy in many categories
 Pittsburgh Penguins win the Stanley Cup against the Detroit Red Wings

Synchronized skating

See also
 2009 in skiing
 2009 in sports

References

External links
 Federation of International Bandy
 The International Bobsleigh and Skeleton Federation
 World Curling Federation
 International Skating Union
 International Ice Hockey Federation
 International Luge Federation

Ice sports
Ice sports by year
Ice sports